"I Missed Again" is a song from Phil Collins's debut solo album, Face Value. This song is the seventh song on the CD and the first song on the second side on the record. The song features a tenor sax solo from British jazz musician Ronnie Scott.

Background
Like many of the songs on Face Value, "I Missed Again" is about Collins's anger and frustration about his first wife leaving him. The original demo was entitled "I Miss You, Babe", with sadder lyrics - this demo version was later released as a B-side of "If Leaving Me Is Easy". He re-wrote the lyrics, gave the song a different tempo, and re-titled it "I Missed Again" in an effort to make it lighthearted instead of sad.

Record World called it a "mid-tempo rocker [that] has R&B underpinnings, melodic pop keyboard currents, and Collins' easily identifiable light tenor."

Music video
The song's music video features Collins on a white background singing and miming the various instruments. It was released on VHS in 1983. It received a Grammy nomination for Best Video, Short Form.

Credits 
"I Missed Again"
Phil Collins – vocals, piano, Prophet-5, drums 
Daryl Stuermer – guitar
John Giblin – bass 
The Phenix Horns:
Don Myrick – tenor saxophone
Louis Satterfield – trombone
Rahmlee Michael Davis – trumpet
Michael Harris – trumpet
Ronnie Scott – tenor sax solo
L. Shankar – violins
"I'm Not Moving"
Phil Collins – vocals, drums, percussion, piano, Prophet 5, Roland VP-330 vocoder
John Giblin – bass

Gavin Cochrane – photography

Chart performance
In the US, "I Missed Again" was the first single from Face Value. It peaked at No. 19 on the Billboard Hot 100 chart in May 1981. It reached No. 14 in the UK.

Weekly charts

Year-end charts

Popular culture
The song was featured in a late 1980s promotional commercial, which featured bloopers, by the National Basketball Association. It was also used in the early 1990s by the BBC in a montage of snooker players missing shots. Similarly, NBC Sunday Night Football played the song immediately after kicker Eddy Piñeiro missed the second of two field goals during the Chicago Bears' game against the Los Angeles Rams on 17 November 2019.

References

External links
 

1981 singles
Atlantic Records singles
Phil Collins songs
Virgin Records singles
Song recordings produced by Phil Collins
1981 songs
Songs written by Phil Collins
Song recordings produced by Hugh Padgham